Up Pompeii!'s first series originally aired on BBC1 between 30 March and 11 May 1970. The pilot episode, "Up Pompeii!", premiered on the BBC's Comedy Playhouse on 17 September 1969. The first series was written by Talbot Rothwell, best remembered for his scripts for the Carry On films.

Main actors
The main actors of the first series are:

Guest actors
The major guest actors of the first series are:

List of episodes

External links
 

1970 British television seasons